Mohamed Binyyan Al-Kaledi (born 13 February 1971) is a Kuwaiti footballer. He competed in the men's tournament at the 1992 Summer Olympics.

References

External links
 

1971 births
Living people
Kuwaiti footballers
Kuwait international footballers
Olympic footballers of Kuwait
Footballers at the 1992 Summer Olympics
Place of birth missing (living people)
Association football midfielders
Qadsia SC players
Kuwait Premier League players